Eukaryotic translation initiation factor 5A-2 is a protein that in humans is encoded by the EIF5A2 gene.

References

Further reading